is a fictional character in the Soulcalibur series of video games. She was created by Namco's Project Soul division. Tira was originally introduced in Soulcalibur III and has returned in Soulcalibur IV, Soulcalibur V and Soulcalibur VI. A mentally unstable young woman, Tira is a former member of an assassination guild, the Bird of Passage, who left the group due to her state, eventually becoming a loyal servant of the cursed sword, Soul Edge, and its wielder, Nightmare. While originally only having a case of split personality, the influence of Soul Edge and its counterpart, Soul Calibur, breaks Tira's mind even further that she currently possesses two different personalities: jolly and gloomy.

The character is positively received by the public, often noted for her unique style of clothing and sexual appeal, although her fighting style has received mixed reception, with some citating it difficult to control. Tira's likeness has been also used on various merchandise related to the series.

Conception and creation

As a character introduced in Soulcalibur III, Tira's weapon was created before her own concept, a "ring blade" designed to be unique amongst the game's pre-existing weaponry. Her design and concept were built to revolve around it, starting with gender, then physical measurements, and lastly background details. Her appearance and movement were fleshed out by the team's concept artist Aya Takemura, who designed her with the intention of having the character appeal to European audiences. Afterwards, her character was rendered as a 3D model by a design team that worked solely on her, and then animated by a motion designer using motion capture and working directly with the team, utilizing acrobatics and a hula hoop to keep the animation unique and uniform while simultaneously fluid and feminine. During this phase the team additionally worked with the Soulcalibur story creators, refining the character's own story as needed throughout development.

Design
Her appearance is based on her emotional instability and madness, representing her mood through her trashed clothing and makeup. The instability is also represented in the game, such as sulking when she loses a match only to cheer up suddenly afterwards. In addition, emphasis was placed on her movements and attacks to give her the appearance of dancing while fighting.

In Soulcalibur IV, her attire was changed from green to red to emphasize her now dual-personality and the fact she was slightly more evil. In addition, her other features appear to have been redesigned completely for this purpose as well; she got long black hair tied in lopsided pigtails, her eyes are now purplish-red, and she wears black eye makeup and red lipstick rather than all-green makeup.

In video games
Tira first appeared in Soulcalibur III, as an assassin that fled her previous group due to her mental instability. Though she attempted a peaceful life in a quiet city, she eventually found her urge to kill uncontrollable and wandered until she learned of the living sword Soul Edge and its wielder, Nightmare. Sensing a kindred spirit, she pledged her loyalty to the sword, and sought both a new host for Soul Edge and to destroy its antithesis, the sword Soul Calibur. At the story's climax, the energy released by Soul Edge and Soul Calibur clashing caused her personality to split into two extremes, Jolly and Gloomy. When Soul Edge returned in Soulcalibur IV, she resumed her service to him, manipulating others into helping, such as Sophitia by kidnapping her daughter, Pyrrha.

In Soulcalibur V, set 17 years after the events of IV, both Nightmare and Soul Edge had resurfaced after being destroyed at the end of IV, the former possessing a swordsman ruling Hungary. Disapproving the current state of her master, Tira intended to use Pyrrha as a new vessel of Soul Edge by manipulating the latter's isolation and earlier exposure to Soul Edge. However, she was confronted by Pyrrha's younger brother, Patroklos. Defeated, she escaped Patroklos' wrath and left Pyrrha with him, but later convinced Pyrrha to follow her again when Patroklos was reluctant to accept her state. A more mature-looking Tira returns in Soulcalibur VI. In this game, she has very little empathy on humans and enjoys killing people, treating it like a hobby.

Gameplay 
Tira's fighting style was developed for intermediate-level players in contrast to the other new characters introduced in Soulcalibur III. In the game's storyline, her fighting style was explained as a "Dance of Death", intended to mesmerize an opponent before killing them.

In Soulcalibur IV, Tira's fighting style was heavily modified, now consisting of two modes: "Jolly" and "Gloomy", indicated by her fighting stance and tone of voice. Though certain attacks could trigger a switch from one to the other, the switch could also occur randomly when hit or when performing certain attacks. Of the two, her Gloomy mode results in stronger and more offensive attacks, but many of these attacks will damage her as well upon usage regardless of whether or not they strike the opponent. Due to the nature of the switch between modes, several attacks can be chained together from their Jolly version to a Gloomy counterpart of another attack and vice versa. As a result, several attacks such as Ptarmigan Polka can be chained into defensive attacks, reducing the effectiveness of a counterattack by the opponent.

Promotion and reception
Tira was one of the two playable characters in Namco's E3 2005 public demonstration of Soulcalibur III alongside Mitsurugi; at the event a life-size promotional model of the character was also featured. Through the English website for the game, a promotional electronic "trading card" was available, showing in-fight gameplay and background information for her. In 2006, Namco released a Tira figurine as part of a Soulcalibur III set based upon her promotional artwork for the game. While not posable, the PVC figure came with three interchangeable ring blades for it to hold; an alternate color version was later released in a secondary set. Yujin released a four inch tall immobile figurine of Tira after the release of Soulcalibur III, based upon her artwork for the title as part of their "Namco Girls Series #6" line of gashapon figurines.

Tira's behavior in Soulcalibur III led to the suspicion of her having multiple personalities, as her mood and voice would shift suddenly and dramatically. IGN described her gameplay as having "plenty of bizarre and powerful moves mixed with a smattering of chained 'perma-moves'," while GameSpot's staff described her as different than the female character stereotype of fast but weak, and a more deliberate fighting style and a "change of pace." At the 2005 Tokyo Game Show presentation of Soulcalibur III, the character was not received well by players, cited as difficult to control and light on damage. GameSpy added that "the jury is out" regarding her attack style, describing her as difficult to control. Impress Watch on the other hand praised her gameplay, stating her movements and fighting style made her quite unique in the series. However, her English voice acting has been a source of criticism for the character, cited in Soulcalibur IV as "grating" and annoying. Criticism has also been made towards her mood-driven gameplay in Soulcalibur IV, due to the random and sometimes inconvenient nature of the shifts.

Tira was featured as one of the girls in GameDaily's article "Babes of the Week: Soul Calibur Hotties", describing her as "one of the more dangerous-looking women introduced in the Soul Calibur series" and "an essential new addition to the series"; GameDaily also included Tira in the list of "Top 50 Hottest Game Babes" at number 19, praised for her "part goth and part carnival performer" design as well as her revealing appearance, later drawing mention also in the article  "Babe of the Week: Chicks with Baggage" due to her mental instability. UGO.com ranked Tira number six in their list of "Top 11 Soulcalibur Fighters", noting a liking of her weapon of choice and describing her as "a force to be reckoned with...also quite the hottie in a dangerous, 'forbidden fruit' sort of way." Mania.com named her one of the "Top 10 Hot But Mostly Bothered Video Game Females", placing fifth on the list and described as "unquestionably hot", though noted as frightening due to the character's fascination with death. Magazine publications have also featured her in a context revolving around her attractiveness, such as play's "Girls of Gaming 5" annual publication.

The Globe and Mail describes Tira as a character "who looks like a refugee from the Cirque du Soleil", while Game Revolution describes her as "a lithe little wench who apparently idolizes Uma Thurman's Poison Ivy", noting she "adds a needed gust of fresh air" to the series. Comparisons have also been made to fellow DC character Harley Quinn. IGN included her in their "Babes of Soulcalibur" article, stating "She immediately stands out (...) Whereas most of the SC women fight on the side of good, Tira is totally, deliciously evil." They also praised her outfits, calling them some of the best in the Soul series. The Escapist online magazine stated "Tira's bi-polar hysterics match her ever-shifting stances and frenetic attacks," and added the aspect of her character brought her fighting style into sharp focus.

References

Fantasy video game characters
Female characters in video games
Female video game villains
Fictional blade and dart throwers
Fictional characters with dissociative identity disorder
Fictional criminals in video games
Fictional European people
Fictional female assassins
Fictional mass murderers
Fictional henchmen in video games
Namco antagonists
Soulcalibur series characters
Teenage characters in video games
Video game characters introduced in 2005
Woman soldier and warrior characters in video games